The Scottish School of Primary Care (SSPC) is an organisation that co-ordinates a programme of research and training of primary care in Scotland. The School was launched in 2000. By 2007 there were 1700 people involved in this virtual organisation, including Scottish academics with an interest in primary care research and clinicians who have an involvement with research alongside their normal clinical work.

A programme of work at the school led to the publication of landmark paper on multimorbidity in 2012.

In 2007, Frank Sullivan was appointed Director. In September 2015, John Gillies took up the position of Depute Director.

References

External links
 

Medical and health organisations based in Scotland
Medical research institutes in the United Kingdom
Organizations established in 2000
2000 establishments in Scotland